Unbalance na Kiss o Shite (アンバランスなKissをして / An Unbalanced Kiss) is the second single released by Japanese artist Hiro Takahashi on December 17, 1993. It peaked on the Oricon charts at No. 28 upon its initial debut, and again in 2005 at No. 187. The single had also charted in 2004 with the song  by Matsuko Mawatari, which was written by Hsiao-Lung Lee and Matsuko Mawatari.

This song also became the third ending of the anime series YuYu Hakusho.

Track listing

1993 release

2005 release

Personnel
Norihiko Hibino: arrangement
Hiro Takahashi: keyboards, synthesizer, chorus
Tamiaki: electric guitar
Daisuke Kawai: organ, synthesizer

Covers
Eizo Japan - track #5 on album EIZO Japan 1 (2009)
misono - covered a clip of the song in "misono to Utaou! Animedley II", track #5 from her album Cover Album (2009)
M.O.E - track #16 on album Oretachi no Uta wo Kiku CD (2011)
Lead - track #3 on their jacket A edition of their single Hurricane (2011). They released an alternate version of the song on their CD+COUPLING BEST version of their studio album Now or Never (2012).
Ayabie - track #1 on album V-ANIME ROCKS evolution (2013).

Chart positions

Charts

Year-end charts

References

1993 singles
2005 singles
YuYu Hakusho
Anime songs
Torch songs
1993 songs
Songs written by Hiro Takahashi